Gnomoniella is a genus of fungi in the family Gnomoniaceae. The genus contains 13 species.
Gnomoniopsis is a genus of fungi in the family Gnomoniaceae including:

Gnomoniella albomaculans Neger
Gnomoniella alnobetulae
Gnomoniella amygdalina (Fuckel) Sacc.  
Gnomoniella avellanae Sacc., 1882
Gnomoniella brunaudiana Pass.
Gnomoniella carpinea (Fr.) M. Monod
 Gnomoniopsis castanea also called Gnomoniopsis smithogilvyi
Gnomoniella devexa var. media Sacc.
 Gnomoniella euphorbiae (Fuckel) Sacc.
Gnomoniella euphorbiae-verrucosae M. Monod
Gnomoniella fasciculata (Fuckel) Sacc.
Gnomoniella fraxini - Ash anthracnose
Gnomoniella hippocastani Brunaud
Gnomoniella idaeicola (P.Karst.) Sacc.
Gnomoniella microspora M. Monod
Gnomoniella nana Rehm
Gnomoniella rubicola Pass. - on dead stems of Rubus
Gnomoniella tubiformis, Gnomoniella tubaeformis (Tode) Sacc., 1882
Gnomoniella vagans Johanson
Gnomoniella vasarii M. Monod

References

External links 

 Gnomoniella at Index Fungorum

Gnomoniaceae
Sordariomycetes genera